The Anger Management Tour is a concert film directed by Donn J. Viola, documenting American rapper Eminem's live concert at The Palace of Auburn Hills in Detroit as part of his second Anger Management Tour. The taped event, also featuring D12, Obie Trice and Dina Rae, was recorded on September 8, 2002 and released on June 28, 2005 via Aftermath Entertainment.

The second edition of Anger Management Tour concerts, including The Anger Management Tour, were in support of Eminem's fourth solo studio album The Eminem Show.

Track listing

Charts

Certifications

References

External links

Concert films
2005 video albums
Eminem video albums
Films shot in Detroit
Aftermath Entertainment soundtracks
Aftermath Entertainment compilation albums